Centrale may refer to:

Places
 Centrale (Milan Metro), a rail station in Milan, Italy
 Centrale (shopping centre) in Croydon, South London
 Centrale tram stop, named after the shopping centre above
 Centrale Region, Togo
 138 East 50th Street, a condominium tower in Midtown Manhattan

Schools
 Centrale Graduate School : Graduate engineering school (France)
 École centrale de Lille
 École centrale de Lyon
 École centrale de Marseille
 École centrale de Nantes
 École Centrale Paris

Other
 The os centrale carpal and tarsal bone in the wrists and ankles of land vertebrates